Gloria Arias Haskins (born July 11, 1956) was a member of the South Carolina House of Representatives, first elected in a special election following the death of her husband Terry Haskins.

Haskins was born in Bogota, Colombia to Salomon Arias and his wife Betty Bardon.  She attended college at both the City University of New York and Bob Jones University.

Haskins was a member of the State House from 2000 to 2008, when she was defeated in the Republican primary by Wendy Nanney.

Sources
South Carolina legislature bio of Haskins

1956 births
American politicians of Colombian descent
Bob Jones University alumni
Colombian emigrants to the United States
Living people
Republican Party members of the South Carolina House of Representatives
Politicians from Bogotá
Women state legislators in South Carolina
21st-century American women